Dog Years is an EP by American hard rock supergroup The Winery Dogs. It was released on August 4, 2017.

Track listing
All tracks written by The Winery Dogs except track 4 (Gary Wright) and track 5 (David Bowie).

References

The Winery Dogs albums
2017 EPs